David E. Davis (1913–1994) was an ecologist and animal behaviorist noted for being the "founder of modern rat studies".

He received a BA at Swarthmore College in 1935, then an MS and PhD at Harvard University in 1939.  His career included 13 years as assistant professor at Johns Hopkins School of Hygiene and Public Health where, among other works, he started the Rodent Ecology Project.  Through systematic research he debunked the myth of 1 rat per person in NYC, and placed the rat population at about 250,000.

He later became a professor at Pennsylvania State University, then chairman of Zoology at North Carolina State University at Raleigh.  During his career he published 3 books and 230 papers.

References 

1913 births
1994 deaths
American ecologists
Swarthmore College alumni
Harvard University alumni
Pennsylvania State University faculty
North Carolina State University faculty
Johns Hopkins University faculty